Willian Bøving Vick (born 1 March 2003) is a Danish footballer who plays as a forward for Austrian club SK Sturm Graz.

Career statistics

Club

Honours
Copenhagen
 Danish Superliga: 2021–22

References

External links
 

2003 births
Living people
Danish men's footballers
Association football forwards
Denmark youth international footballers
Denmark under-21 international footballers
F.C. Copenhagen players
SK Sturm Graz players
Danish Superliga players
Austrian Football Bundesliga players
Danish expatriate men's footballers
Expatriate footballers in Austria